Kosobudy may refer to the following places:
Kosobudy, Lublin Voivodeship (east Poland)
Kosobudy, Pomeranian Voivodeship (north Poland)
Kosobudy, Drawsko County in West Pomeranian Voivodeship (north-west Poland)
Kosobudy, Szczecinek County in West Pomeranian Voivodeship (north-west Poland)